Centre Union may refer to:

 Centre Union, a former political party in Greece
 Centre Union – New Forces, a former political party in Greece
 Centre Union of Lithuania, a former political party in Lithuania

See also 
 Union of the Centre (disambiguation)